Thiruvonam is a 1975 Indian Malayalam-language film, directed by Sreekumaran Thampi and produced by K. P. Mohanan. The film stars Prem Nazir, Sharada, Kamal Haasan and Jayasudha. The film has musical score by R. K. Shekhar and songs composed by M. K. Arjunan.

Cast 

Prem Nazir as Babu
Sharada as Radhika
Kamal Haasan as Prem Kumar
Jayasudha as Shandini
M. G. Soman as Padmakumar 
Sujatha as Sujatha
Kaviyoor Ponnamma
Sreelatha Namboothiri as Sandhyarani 
T. S. Muthaiah as Kumar
Chandraji as Chandiran pillai 
K. P. Ummer as Damotharan
Adoor Bhasi as Abimanyu
K. P. A. C. Lalitha as Valsala
Cochin Haneefa  
 Karan(Master Raghu) as Babu, child age. 
 Baby Sumathi as Manju 
 Philomina as Servant  
 Alummoodan  
 Jagathy Sreekumar  
 Vincent  
 Prathapachandran

Production 
Thiruvonam film directed by Sreekumaran Thampi, produced by K. P. Mohan under production banner Vandana Films. It was given an "U" (Unrestricted) certificate by the Central Board of Film Certification.

Soundtrack 

The film's soundtrack was composed by M. K. Arjunan; the lyrics were written by Sreekumaran Thampi.
 
The song "Thiruvonappularithan" is set in the carnatic raga known as Arabhi, the song was well received in Malayalam songs sung by playback singer Vani Jairam, but the video footage of the song is not available at present.

References

External links 
 

1975 films
1970s Malayalam-language films
Films directed by Sreekumaran Thampi